Paul Leger (1 August 1896 – 28 July 1942) was a French racing cyclist. He rode in the 1929 Tour de France.

References

1896 births
1942 deaths
French male cyclists
Sportspeople from Oise
Cyclists from Hauts-de-France